The state auditor of Alabama is constitutionally required to make a complete report to the governor of Alabama showing the receipts and disbursement of every character, all claims audited and paid out, and all taxes and revenues collected and paid into the treasury. The office also makes other reports to the governor and the Alabama Legislature as the law requires. Since 1969, the office has been responsible for maintaining all property records of all non-consumable property of the State of Alabama. Until 1899 the office was responsible for maintaining all land records of the state when at that time, that function was transferred to the Alabama Forestry Commission. A separate Office of Public Examiners administers audits conducted by the state.

The state auditor also serves as a member of The State Board of Adjustment, The State Board of Appointment for Boards of Registrars, The State Board of Compromise, The Alabama Education Authority (ex officio), and The Penny Trust Fund.

Election of State Auditor

The state auditor is an elected post chosen in partisan elections. It is elected in the same cycle as the other constitutional officers of the U.S. state of Alabama, including the governor, lieutenant governor, attorney general, state treasurer, and secretary of state. State law prohibits any individual from being elected to more than two consecutive terms. Women have traditionally held the office for most of the past sixty years. Nine women have held the post starting with the election of Agnes Baggett in 1954.

The current state auditor is Andrew Sorrell, who took office on January 16, 2023. He was previously a Republican member of the Alabama House of Representatives from the 3rd district. His predecessor as auditor was Jim Zeigler, a fellow Republican who held the office from 2015 to 2023. He was constitutionally ineligible to seek a third term and unsuccessfully ran for Secretary of State of Alabama instead. Sorrell won the Republican primary and general election to succeed Zeigler in 2022.

Listed below are the state auditors for the past several terms:

 Andrew Sorrell (R) (2023–present)
 Jim Zeigler (R) (2015–2023)
 Samantha Shaw (R) (2007–2015)
 Beth Chapman (R) (2003–2007)
 Susan Parker (D) (1999–2003)
 Pat Duncan (R) (1995–1999)
 Terry Ellis (D) (1991–1995)
 Jan Cook (D) (1983–1991)
 Bettye Frink (D) (1975–1983)
 Melba Till Allen (D) (1967–1975)
 Bettye Frink (D) (1963–1967)
 Mary Texas Hurt Garner (D) (1959–1963)
 Agnes Baggett (D) (1955–1959)

2022 State Auditor of Alabama election

Republican primary

Candidates

Nominee
 Andrew Sorrell, member of the Alabama House of Representatives from the 3rd district (2018–2022)

Eliminated
 Stan Cooke, professional counselor and previous candidate for this seat in 2018 (eliminated in runoff)
 Rusty Glover, former member of the Alabama Senate from the 34th district (2006–2018) (eliminated in first round)

First round

Endorsements

Results

Runoff

Debates and forums
Candidates Cooke and Sorrell squared off in a debate at the Gardendale Civic Center just more than a week ahead of the Republican primary runoff on June 13, 2022. The debate was cosponsored by WYDE-FM and 1819 News.

Results

Libertarian nomination
No primary was held for the Libertarian Party, and the party instead nominated candidates.

Nominee
Leigh Lachine

General election

2018 State Auditor of Alabama election

Republican primary

General election

2014 State Auditor of Alabama election

Republican Primary

Advanced to runoff

General election

2010 State Auditor of Alabama election

2006 State Auditor of Alabama election

Republican Primary

Advanced to runoff

Democratic Primary

General election

2002 State Auditor of Alabama election

Republican Primary

Advanced to runoff

Democratic Primary

Advanced to runoff

General election

References

External links

Alabama